Junta Vecinal Mariscal Santa Cruz is a Bolivian football team playing at Torneo Nacional Interprovincial. It is based in El Alto.  Their home stadium is Estadio Los Andes. The team played in the Liga Nacional B in 2011–12 season and finish in 8th.

National honours
Torneo Nacional Interprovincial: 1 (2011)

JV Mariscal
Association football clubs established in 2005
2005 establishments in Bolivia